Lloyd Leslie Burke (September 29, 1924 – June 1, 1999) was a soldier in the United States Army during the Korean War. He received the Medal of Honor for his actions on October 28, 1951.

Military career
In 1943, Burke was eighteen years old when he dropped out of Henderson State College (now Henderson State University) in Arkansas. He joined the United States Army and served two years during World War II with combat engineers in Italy. After being discharged, he joined the ROTC when he returned to Henderson State College, where the ROTC program today is nicknamed "Burke's Raiders."  There he became a member of Phi Sigma Epsilon fraternity. In 1950, he graduated as a Distinguished Military Graduate. 

After accepting his commission, he was dispatched to Korea five months later. At the time, he was the leader of Company G, 2nd Battalion, 5th Cavalry Regiment. When Chinese forces crossed the Yalu River, Burke managed to lead his platoon to safety. As a result of his action, he was awarded the Silver Star, which was later upgraded to the Distinguished Service Cross, and two Purple Hearts.

Hill 200
Burke's tour of duty was almost over in October 1951. At the time, Burke was found at the rear of his regiment. He had a plane ticket in his pocket and was eager to see his wife and infant son.  away, Burke's company was attempting to cross the Yokkok-chon River. The company was hindered by a large and well-entrenched Chinese force on Hill 200. The battle raged for days, with the 2nd Battalion's attacks being constantly repulsed. At first, Lieutenant Burke kept up with the reports. Eventually, he could no longer remain on the sidelines. As he himself stated, "I couldn't see leaving my guys up there without trying to do something."

When Burke was at the base of Hill 200, he was shocked to witness his company's strength reduced to 35 traumatized survivors. Burke described the condition of his company: 
These men were completely beat. They lay huddled in foxholes, unable to move. They all had the thousand-yard stare of men who'd seen too much fighting, too much death. 
Burke dragged up a 57 mm recoilless rifle and shot three rounds at the closest enemy bunker. The bunker itself was a wooden-fronted structure covering a cave, which was dug into the overall hillside. The Chinese attacked American troops by hurling grenades from their trenches. Burke aimed his M1 rifle at the trench line and shot at every Chinese soldier who rose to throw a grenade. Unfortunately, the grenades were still being thrown. After firing an eight-round clip, Burke decided to take more drastic measures. As he recalled, "I considered myself a pretty fair shot, but this was getting ridiculous. I had to do something."

When the Chinese momentarily stopped firing, Burke jumped into one of the trenches with a pistol in one hand and a grenade in the other. He shot five or six Chinese soldiers in the forehead. Burke also fired at two Chinese soldiers from further down the trench. Afterwards, he threw his grenade in their direction, jumped out of the trench, and placed himself against the dirt berm. The Chinese were aware of Burke's location and began throwing grenades at his position. Most of the grenades thrown rolled down the hill and harmlessly exploded. Some of the grenades, however, did explode near Burke. He managed to catch three of them and toss them back at the Chinese. At the same time, troops from Burke's company threw grenades. However, some of those grenades exploded near Burke.

Burke abandoned the dirt berm by crawling off to the side, where he found cover in a gully. The gully itself ended further up Hill 200 at a Korean burial mound. After edging his way up the hill, Burke peeked over the top of the burial mound. The trench was covered in enfilade, was curved around the hill and contained many Chinese troops. Surprisingly, the Chinese were relaxing, with some of them talking, sitting, and laughing, while others were throwing grenades and firing mortars. Burke went down the gully to Company G's position and told Sergeant Arthur Foster, the senior NCO, "Get'em ready to attack when I give you the signal!" Burke then dragged the last functioning Browning model 1919 machine gun and three cans of ammunition back up the hill. On top of the burial mound, he mounted the machine gun, set the screw to free traverse, and prepared his 250-round ammunition box. He began firing at the nearest part of the Chinese trench where the mortars were located. After Burke shot at all of the Chinese mortar squads, he then fired upon a machine gun emplacement. Afterwards, Burke fired up and down the trench at Chinese soldiers too shocked to react. Eventually, the Chinese fled down the trench in a panic. Burke continued to fire until his Browning jammed. While he attempted to clear his weapon, an enemy soldier started throwing grenades at him. Burke not only ignored this, he also ignored the grenade fragments that tore open the back of his hand. Eventually, Burke was able to clear his weapon and kill the Chinese grenadier.

Meanwhile, Sergeant Foster led a small group to Burke's location and was told by Burke to provide extra firepower. Burke and the others were convinced that they were under siege from a full-sized force instead of a few adamant skirmishers. As the Chinese retreated, Burke wrapped his field jacket around the Browning's hot barrel sleeve and tore the 31-pound weapon off its tripod. He then wrapped the ammunition belt around his body, walked towards the trench, and fired upon retreating units. Foster and his men followed. When Burke ran out of Browning ammunition, he used his .45 automatic and grenades in order to clear out bunkers. At Hill 200, Burke killed over 100 men and decimated two mortar emplacements and three machine gun nests. For his actions, he was awarded the Medal of Honor at a White House ceremony on April 11, 1952.

Vietnam and later
He was the commanding officer of the 2nd Brigade, 16th Infantry Regiment, 1st Infantry Division, at Bien Hoa on 1965. On 22 July 1965, while commanding combat operations from a helicopter, Burke was shot down by small arms fire. He had to return to the United States and was hospitalized for an extended period of time. Once out of the hospital, he was assigned to Germany. Overall, he spent 35 years in the US Armed Forces, served as the Army's liaison officer to the United States Congress, and retired with the rank of full colonel in 1978.

He is buried in Arlington National Cemetery Arlington, Virginia. His grave can be located in section 7A, grave 155, map Grid U-23.5.

Awards and decorations
Colonel Burke's awards include:

Medal of Honor citation
Rank and organization: First Lieutenant, U.S. Army

Company G, 5th Cavalry Regiment, 1st Cavalry Division

Place and date: Near Chong-dong, Korea, October 28, 1951

Entered service at: Stuttgart, Arkansas Born: September 29, 1924, Tichnor, Arkansas

G.O. No.: 43.

Citation:

1st Lt. Burke, distinguished himself by conspicuous gallantry and outstanding courage above and beyond the call of duty in action against the enemy. Intense enemy fire had pinned down leading elements of his company committed to secure commanding ground when 1st Lt. Burke left the command post to rally and urge the men to follow him toward 3 bunkers impeding the advance. Dashing to an exposed vantage point he threw several grenades at the bunkers, then, returning for an Ml rifle and adapter, he made a lone assault, wiping out the position and killing the crew. Closing on the center bunker he lobbed grenades through the opening and, with his pistol, killed 3 of its occupants attempting to surround him. Ordering his men forward he charged the third emplacement, catching several grenades in midair and hurling them back at the enemy. Inspired by his display of valor his men stormed forward, overran the hostile position, but were again pinned down by increased fire. Securing a light machine gun and 3 boxes of ammunition, 1st Lt. Burke dashed through the impact area to an open knoll, set up his gun and poured a crippling fire into the ranks of the enemy, killing approximately 75. Although wounded, he ordered more ammunition, reloading and destroying 2 mortar emplacements and a machine gun position with his accurate fire. Cradling the weapon in his arms he then led his men forward, killing some 25 more of the retreating enemy and securing the objective. 1st Lt. Burke's heroic action and daring exploits inspired his small force of 35 troops. His unflinching courage and outstanding leadership reflect the highest credit upon himself, the infantry, and the U.S. Army.

See also

List of Medal of Honor recipients
List of Korean War Medal of Honor recipients

Notes

References

Kirchner, Paul. The Deadliest Men: The World's Deadliest Combatants throughout the Ages. Colorado: Paladin Press, 2001.

1924 births
1999 deaths
United States Army personnel of World War II
United States Army personnel of the Korean War
United States Army personnel of the Vietnam War
Korean War recipients of the Medal of Honor
United States Army Medal of Honor recipients
Recipients of the Distinguished Service Cross (United States)
Recipients of the Silver Star
People from Arkansas County, Arkansas
Burials at Arlington National Cemetery
American United Methodists
20th-century Methodists
American expatriates in Italy